Hardy's Well was a public house located at the end of the Curry Mile, at 257 Wilmslow Road, in Rusholme, south Manchester, near to Platt Fields Park. The 200-year-old building is named after Hardy's Brewery, and was formerly known as Birch Villa, later the Birch Villa Hotel, which has existed on the site since 1837. The front of the building has a Hardy's mosaic on it, and is two storeys high with three bays, built of red brick.

Following from a conversation between Lemn Sissay and the landlord & Landlady (Andy Pye and Melanie Pemberton ) in 1994, it has one of the first public poems written on one of its gable walls. The poem is known as "Hardy's Well", after the name of the pub and was painted onto the wall by the Landlady at the time Melanie Pemberton  Sissay went on to display poetry UK-wide.

It was a popular venue for University of Manchester students, and of Manchester City F.C. fans when the club was based at Maine Road.

It is owned by Enterprise Inns. It was listed as an Asset of community value in 2015 as a result of an application by the Rusholme & Fallowfield Civic Society. The pub closed in July 2016, and is at risk of being demolished. A planning application by Eamar Development to turn it into flats and shops was submitted in 2018, which would see the shell of the pub incorporated into a larger building, with the poem on the wall as part of the inside of the foyer as well as replicated on the new building's outside wall. The new building would be 6 storeys tall, and contain 62 flats with shops on the ground floor.

References 

Pubs in Manchester
Public art in England
Assets of community value
British poetry
Former pubs in England